Estoy Enamorado (Spanish for "I'm in love") may refer to:

"Estoy Enamorado" (Donato & Estéfano song), 1995; covered by Thalía, 2009
"Estoy Enamorado" (Wisin & Yandel song), 2010

See also
I'm in Love (disambiguation)